In mathematics, Cartan's criterion gives conditions for a Lie algebra in characteristic 0 to be  solvable, which implies a related criterion for the Lie algebra to be semisimple. It is based on the notion of the Killing form, a symmetric bilinear form on  defined by the formula
 
where tr denotes the trace of a linear operator.

Cartan's criterion for solvability 

Cartan's criterion for solvability states:
A Lie subalgebra   of endomorphisms of a finite-dimensional vector space over a field of characteristic zero is solvable if and only if  whenever 

The fact that  in the solvable case follows from Lie's theorem that puts  in the upper triangular form over the algebraic closure of the ground field (the trace can be computed after extending the ground field). The converse can be deduced from the nilpotency criterion based on the Jordan–Chevalley decomposition (for the proof, follow the link).

Applying Cartan's criterion to the adjoint representation gives: 
A finite-dimensional Lie algebra  over a field of characteristic zero is solvable if and only if  (where K is the Killing form).

Cartan's criterion for semisimplicity 

Cartan's criterion for semisimplicity states:
 A finite-dimensional Lie algebra  over a field of characteristic zero is semisimple if and only if the Killing form is non-degenerate.

 gave a very short proof that if a finite-dimensional Lie algebra (in any characteristic) has a non-degenerate invariant bilinear form and no non-zero abelian ideals, and in particular if its Killing form is non-degenerate,  then it is a sum of simple Lie algebras.

Conversely, it follows easily from Cartan's criterion for solvability that a semisimple algebra (in characteristic 0) has a non-degenerate Killing form.

Examples

Cartan's criteria  fail in  characteristic ; for example:
If k has characteristic 2 then the semidirect product gl2(k).k2 is a solvable Lie algebra, but the Killing form is not identically zero on its derived algebra sl2(k).k2.

If a finite-dimensional Lie algebra is nilpotent, then  the Killing form is identically zero (and more generally the Killing form vanishes on any nilpotent ideal). The converse is false: there are non-nilpotent Lie algebras whose Killing form vanishes. An example is given by the semidirect product of an abelian Lie algebra V  with a 1-dimensional Lie algebra acting on V as an endomorphism b such that b is not nilpotent and Tr(b2)=0.

In characteristic 0, every reductive Lie algebra (one that is a sum of abelian and simple Lie algebras) has a non-degenerate invariant symmetric bilinear form. However the converse is false: a Lie algebra with a non-degenerate invariant symmetric bilinear form need not be a sum of simple and abelian Lie algebras. A typical counterexample is G = L[t]/tnL[t] where n>1, L is a simple complex Lie algebra with a bilinear form, and the bilinear form on G is given by taking the coefficient of tn−1 of the C[t]-valued bilinear form on G induced by the form on L. The bilinear form is non-degenerate, but the Lie algebra is not a sum of simple and abelian Lie algebras.

Notes

References

See also 
 Modular Lie algebra

Lie algebras